Akhand Bharat, also known as Akhand Hindustan, is a term for the concept of a unified Greater India. It posits that modern-day Afghanistan, Bangladesh, Bhutan, India, Maldives, Myanmar, Nepal, Pakistan, Sri Lanka and Tibet is one nation.

History

During the Indian independence movement, Kanaiyalal Maneklal Munshi advocated for Akhand Hindustan, a proposition that Mahatma Gandhi agreed with, believing that "as Britain wanted to retain her empire by pursuing a policy of divide and rule, Hindu–Muslim unity could not be achieved as long as the British were there." In addition, Mazhar Ali Khan wrote that "the Khan brothers [were] determined to fight for Akhand Hindustan, and challenged the League to fight the issue out before the electorate of the Province." On 7–8 October 1944, in Delhi, Radha Kumud Mukherjee presided over the Akhand Hindustan Leaders' Conference.

The Indian activist and Hindu Mahasabha leader Vinayak Damodar Savarkar at the Hindu Mahasabha's 19th Annual Session in Ahmedabad in 1937 propounded the notion of an Akhand Bharat that "must remain one and indivisible" "from Kashmir to Rameswaram, from Sindh to Assam." He said that "all citizens who owe undivided loyalty and allegiance to the Indian nation and to the Indian state shall be treated with perfect equality and shall share duties and obligations equally in common, irrespective of caste, creed or religion, and the representation also shall either be on the basis of one man one vote or in proportion to the population in case of separate electorates and public services shall go by merit alone."

Contemporary usage
The call for creation of the Akhand Bharat or Akhand Hindustan has on occasions been raised by Hindu nationalist organisations such as the Hindu Mahasabha, Rashtriya Swayamsevak Sangh (RSS), Vishva Hindu Parishad, Shiv Sena, Maharashtra Navnirman Sena, Hindu Sena, Hindu Janajagruti Samiti and Bharatiya Janata Party. One organization sharing this goal, the Akhand Hindustan Morcha, bears the term in its name. Other major Indian political parties such as the centrist Indian National Congress do not subscribe to a call for Akhand Bharat, although India formally claims the entire region of Kashmir (territorially divided between India, Pakistan and China) as an integral part of India through official maps.

Pre-1947 maps of India, showing the modern states of Pakistan and Bangladesh as part of British India illustrate the borders of a proto-Akhand Bharat. The creation of an Akhand Bharat is also ideologically linked with the concept of Hindutva (Hindu nationalism) and the ideas of sangathan (unity) and shuddhi (purification).

The first chapter of the Rashtriya Swayamsevak Sangh textbook for standard VII students at Akhil Bharatiya Sanskrit Gyan Pariksha included a map depicting Pakistan and Bangladesh, which along with post-partition India, were territories that were part of "Akhand Bharat" and a trade union magazine of the same organization also included Nepal, Bhutan, and Myanmar.

While the leadership of the right-wing BJP wavers on the issue, the RSS has always been a strong proponent of the idea. RSS leader H. V. Seshadri's book The Tragic Story of Partition stresses the importance of the concept of Akhand Bharat. The RSS affiliated magazine Organiser often publishes editorials by leaders such as the present Sarsanghachalak, Mohan Bhagwat, espousing the philosophy that only Akhand Bharat and sampoorna samaj (united society) can bring "real" freedom to the people of India. The call for Indian reunification has been supported by Indian Prime Minister Narendra Modi, and BJP National General Secretary Ram Madhav.

In December 2015, following Narendra Modi's diplomatic visit to Lahore, Pakistan, the BJP National Secretary Ram Madhav (in an interview with Al Jazeera's Mehdi Hassan) described that "The RSS still believes that one day [India, Pakistan and Bangladesh], which have for historical reasons separated only 60 years ago, will again, through popular goodwill, come together and Akhand Bharat will be created." In March 2019, RSS leader Indresh Kumar claimed that Pakistan would reunite with India by 2025, that Indians would settle in and migrate to Lahore and Lake Mansarovar in Tibet, that an Indian-allied government had been ensured in Dhaka, and that a European Union-style Akhand Bharat would form.

Former Indian Supreme Court Judge Markandey Katju advocated in Pakistani newspaper The Nation that the only solution to the ongoing dispute between India and Pakistan is the reunification of India, Pakistan and Bangladesh under a strong, secular, modern-minded government. He expanded on the reasons for his support for a reunified India in an article for Newslaundry; Katju advocated that such a state would be administered by a secular government. Katju serves as the chairman of the Indian Reunification Association (IRA), which seeks to campaign for this cause. The former Indian Deputy Prime Minister Lal Krishna Advani, in April 2004, similarly endorsed a confederation of the sovereign nations of India and Pakistan as a powerful geopolitical entity rivaling the European Union, United States of America, Russian Federation and People's Republic of China.

Hindu nationalist political groups such as Shiv Sena, have sought the reclamation of Pakistan-administered Kashmir under the pretence of Akhand Bharat, especially after the abrogation of Article 370 and 35A of the Indian constitution (removing the semi-autonomy of Jammu and Kashmir) in August 2019.

On 17 November 2020, the RSS campaigners released a calendar based on the "Akhand Bharat" theme. This calendar was prepared by the province patron of the Vishva Hindu Parishad in Jaipur.

See also
 Indian reunification
 Indo-Pakistani Confederation
 Bharat Mata
 Ghazwa-e-Hind
 Opposition to the partition of India
 Indian nationalism
 Hindu nationalism
 Hindutva
 Greater Tibet

References

External links
 Merge Pakistan, Bangladesh in Akhand Bharat: MVA's swipe at BJP
 NCP will welcome BJP's decision to merge India, Pakistan, Bangladesh, says Maharashtra minister

Anti-Pakistan sentiment
Bangladesh–India relations
Foreign relations of India
Geography of India
Hindi words and phrases
Hindutva
India–Pakistan relations
Irredentism
National unifications
Political ideologies
Politics of India
South Asia
Southeast Asia
Eurasia